Žarko Zečević (born 19 January 1950) is a Serbian retired basketball player, former football administrator, and current businessman.

Known by his widely used nickname Zeka, he is most notable as the controversial and all powerful general-secretary of FK Partizan, a role he performed for more than two decades. Since 2007, he is employed at YugoRosGaz, a subsidiary of Gazprom.

Born to Slavko Zečević (former Police Minister and former FK Partizan managing board member) Žarko's entire sports career, both playing and administrative, is also tied to Partizan Sports Society. During the late 1960s and 1970s, he was a basketball player for KK Partizan and even managed 16 appearances in the Yugoslavia national basketball team jersey, though only in friendly preparation games and minor competitions - he never made the final cut for any of the major competitions (Eurobasket, World Championships, and the Olympics).

Personal
Žarko Zečević is married to Mira who used to work as marketing director at Politika daily newspaper during the 1990s. They have a son and a daughter.

Zečević's sister is married to Danko Đunić, former Partizan Sports Society president.

References

External links
 Навијачи ме „сахрањују”, а власт не реагује; Politika, 3 April 2011

  
 

1950 births
Living people
Basketball players from Belgrade
Serbian men's basketball players
KK Partizan players
FK Partizan non-playing staff
Serbian businesspeople
Serbian sports executives and administrators
Mediterranean Games gold medalists for Yugoslavia
Competitors at the 1971 Mediterranean Games
Mediterranean Games medalists in basketball
Centers (basketball)